Lego Scooby-Doo! Blowout Beach Bash  is a 2017 American computer-animated adventure comedy film, and the twenty-ninth entry in the direct-to-video series of Scooby-Doo films, as well as the second in the series to be based on the Scooby-Doo brand of Lego. It was released digitally on July 11, 2017, and on DVD and Blu-ray on July 25, 2017.

Synopsis
After solving a mystery that involves Dr. Najib posing as a mummy, Scooby-Doo, Shaggy, Fred, Daphne, and Velma feel like taking a break and having some fun. The museum guard suggests that they should go to the Blowout Beach Bingo Bash which just started. The gang agrees, and they take off in the Mystery Machine towards the Bash. During the trip, Shaggy, Scooby and Daphne make fun of Fred and Velma that they were obsessed with mysteries and were no fun. Fred and Velma said that they were determined to prove that they were lots of fun by being crowned this year's 'Captains of the Bash'.

However, when they arrive, they find the beach and the boardwalk deserted with no people. They go to the Holdout Inn, and find out from the inn's owners - Rob and Laura Holdout - that during the morning, two ghost pirates arrived at the beach and frightened all of the teenagers partying there. They also stole the pirate hats off of the 'Bash Captains' - Chad and Krissy Holdout - also the children of the Holdout Inn's owners. Rob Holdout tells the gang the story of the ghost pirates, mentioning the first ever Blowout Beach Bingo Bash, what happened with Captain Brutamore Bash and Pirate Queen Bingo Bell, and the missing treasure. Right after that, a greedy businessman - Dwight Monkfish arrives at the inn with the sheriff, the deputy and his assistant - Mitzi Capaletto. He accuses the Holdouts of the pirate attack earlier that day, but they deny it. Chad and Krissy appears, and are mean towards the gang, making fun of Fred's ascot and insulted Scoobby-Doo. The gang tells the police that they're mystery solvers, and that they could help them with their investigation.

Fred decides how the gang should gather clues to investigate the case: Daphne goes to investigate the pier to find out what she can from Monkfish and Shaggy and Scooby goes to the ghost pirates' ship, the Salty Brick, to check it out. However, Velma told them that there was a snack bar there to persuade them into going, but actually there wasn't one. Instead, there was a boring tour of the ship, led by the Tour Guide. They decided to go to the ship's galley to see if they can find anything to eat.

Meanwhile, Fred and Velma go check out the Octo Rock Lounge. They encounter Chad and Krissy, but they are once again mean towards them and make them go away. At the pier, Daphne is talking with Dwight Monkfish, and he tells her about his plan to transform the town by turning the beach and boardwalk into piers. After he goes to a photo shoot, Daphne asks Mitzi some questions about the pirate attack, Rob Holdout, the pirates themselves and a poem about the missing treasure. Back at the Octo Rock Lounge, Velma accidentally invents a new dance move called the 'Jinky'. Fred and Velma decides to teach the 'Jinky' dance to their new friends Tommy and Brenda, which influences the moods of the other teenagers there, making them dance together as well. Everyone there kept on dancing for a very long time. At the Salty Brick, Shaggy and Scooby encounter the ghost pirates, which leads into a chase around the ship. They successfully escape by distracting the pirates, and flee back towards shore, as the pirates take control of the ship and sale away.

Daphne goes to the Octo Rock Lounge to find Fred and Velma, but sees that everyone there is dancing, including the two. Their attitudes are changed completely, which annoys Daphne. Shaggy and Scooby arrive at the Octo Rock Lounge to tell her that they encountered the pirates, but they show up and terrorize the teenagers. The gang hides from them, but they managed to capture Tommy and Brenda. They go back to the Holdout Inn and discuss everything that happened, causing them to argue with each other. Rob and Laura and walk the gang towards there rooms, where Scooby accidentally discovers the old secret tunnels that the smugglers used. The gang find the Holdouts' room and the police station, but they get lost on their way back towards their room. They accidentally discover a hidden harbor with the Salty Brick as well, along with Tommy and Brenda on the ship. Fred decides to set up a trap for the pirates.

When they return, an ensuing chase occurs, with the gang ending up in their own trap. They are forced to walk the plank, but Tommy and Brenda arrive in a speedboat, which helps the gang escape. However, the pirates chase after them as well in their ship, and they wreak havoc across the boardwalk and the beach, and leave after. At night, everyone gathers on the beach around a campfire, where the Holdouts tell them that they've agreed to sell their property to Monkfish. He comes and insults the Holdouts, which causes Mitzi to scold him, but it doesn't affect anything that was going to happen. Fred lightens up everyone's mood and comes up with a plan to stop the pirates.

The next day, Fred announces that they were going to crown the 'Captains of the Bash'. His plan is revealed, as he wants to use Tommy and Brenda to lure the pirates into their net trap. However, things do not go smoothly, with the pirates targeting Fred and Velma. Another chase occurs between the pirates and the gang, with Fred formulating another plan. The gang misleads the pirates into going on the roller coaster, which ends up flinging Shaggy and Scooby onto the ferris wheel, and the pirates onto a net, where they are captured.

The ghost pirates are then revealed to be Chad and Krissy, and Velma explains that they just couldn't let go of their titles and wanting to stop the bash for some reason as motivation for their attacks. Velma also announces that there are actually two sets of ghost pirates, with the other pair being Rob and Laura Holdout. Velma explains as evidence, that Mr. Holdout said that the best way to solve the case was to work as a team, one set of pirates seemed to move slower than the other, Bell switching from left-handed to right-handed, their knowledge of the town, what they would benefit from the destruction of the boardwalk and other pieces of evidence. Rob and Laura confessed their crimes, and said that they only wanted to find the missing treasure. Daphne also reveals that the sheriff and the deputy destroyed tourism so they didn't have to work so hard. They said that they were the only law in the town, and that they couldn't be arrested. However, the museum guard shows up with Dr. Najib and arrests everyone. Velma successfully solved the poem of the missing treasure and they use it to rebuild the boardwalk. Tommy and Brenda crown the gang the 'Captains of the Bash', and they all celebrate by throwing a party.

Cast

 Frank Welker as Scooby-Doo, Fred Jones
 Matthew Lillard as Shaggy Rogers
 Kate Micucci as Velma Dinkley
 Grey Griffin as Daphne Blake, Ghost of Bingo Bell
 Jeff Bennett as Deputy, Museum Tour Guide
 Kate Higgins as Brenda
 Josh Keaton as Chad Holdout, Tommy
 Tom Kenny as Rob Holdout
 Natalie Lander as Krissy Holdout
 Jack McBrayer as Police Officer
 Kevin Michael Richardson as Ghost of Captain Bash, Sheriff
 Fred Tatasciore as Dwight Monkfish
 Iqbal Theba as Dr. Najib
 Hynden Walch as Mitzi Capaletto

Reception
Renee Longstreet for Common Sense Media gave the film a two out of five star rating and commented, "No surprises in this routine adventure for the gang; they behave in expected ways, solve an expected mystery, and manage a few funny jokes and sight gags about their short, blocky limitations. It's harder for the filmmakers to provide the cartoon spookiness fans are used to. Ghosts and pirates made of synthetic material simply can't be scary apparitions or swash and buckle like they can when animators are given a free hand. Still, it's a typical tale that fans have come to enjoy. The good guys aren't always what they seem to be. Shaggy and Scooby never seem to get enough to eat. Velma uses her problem-solving skills to unearth the culprits. And the gang makes sure that the annual Blowout Beach Bash will live another year."

See also
Lego Scooby-Doo
Lego Scooby-Doo! Knight Time Terror
Lego Scooby-Doo! Haunted Hollywood

References

External links

Warner Bros. Animation animated films
Warner Bros. direct-to-video animated films
Scooby-Doo direct-to-video animated films
2010s English-language films
2017 direct-to-video films
2017 computer-animated films
2017 films
2010s American animated films
Pirate films
American children's animated mystery films
American children's animated comedy films
American mystery films
Films directed by Ethan Spaulding
Scooby-Doo! Blowout Beach Bash
Lego Scooby-Doo films
2010s ghost films
Films set on beaches
2010s children's animated films
American ghost films